Darwinbus is the official operational name of the public bus network which operates within the Greater Darwin region, this includes the satellite cities Palmerston and Casuarina, in addition to the Darwin Rural Area in the Northern Territory. The network is exclusively operated by CDC Northern Territory under a six-year contract with the Northern Territory Government starting from 1 July 2022, and in the financial year prior to the COVID-19 pandemic, carried approximately 3.5 million passengers, equivalent to a 5-6% modeshare. Prior to July 2022, the network was operated by two contractors; CDC Northern Territory (previously known as Buslink), and Territory Transit who had shared operation of the majority of urban bus services.

Services formerly operated by Territory Transit had been run by the government-owned Darwin Bus Service ("DBS") until October 2014, who had provided about 40% of all services in the Darwin region since Buslink commenced operation during the 1980s. In December 2013, it was announced that Darwin Bus Service services would be privatised. In July 2014, Transit Systems (owner of Territory Transit) was announced as the successful tenderer. In October 2014, Territory Transit took over the former Darwin Bus Service bus operation.

In May 2022, CDC Northern Territory was announced as the successful bidder after a competitive tender process. While both incumbents placed bids for the tender, Australian Transit Group also placed a bid during the tender process.

Fleet
As of December 2013, the Buslink fleet consisted of 164 buses based out of depots in Berrimah and Humpty Doo, and the then Darwin Bus Service fleet based in Stuart Park consisted of 36 buses.

After assuming control of the former Darwin Bus Service depot and its fleet at Stuart Park in 2014, Territory Transit began replacement of many older buses in the fleet. A total of 17 Mercedes-Benz O500LE rigid buses with Custom Coaches CB80 bodywork were added between 2015 and 2020, with the size of the fleet reducing slightly to 34 buses. While these additions largely displaced older rigid buses produced by MAN and Volvo, three of four Scania L94UA articulated buses were ultimately replaced. A further two buses (which included the last articulated bus) were withdrawn without replacement prior to CDC Northern Territory taking control of the Stuart Park Depot in 2022. A pair of Mercedes-Benz OH1830LE buses, which had previously been used by Buslink-Vivo, were also based at Stuart Park depot but were mostly utilised for charter work.

CDC Northern Territory's depots at Berrimah and Humpty Doo had a combined total of 158 buses as of February 2022, although the vast majority of these buses are not utilised for public bus services, instead performing charter, school bus and special needs transport duties. While a total of 47 buses are painted in the Darwinbus livery of black, white and ochre, 6 of those buses were utilised exclusively as school buses. Since commencement of the new contract, some of these buses have been returned to urban service at the Stuart Park depot.

As of December 2022, CDC Northern Territory now operates 192 buses in the Greater Darwin area, and an additional 16 in Alice Springs. The increase in Darwin is largely attributable to inheriting the former Territory Transit fleet at Stuart Park, with the combined urban fleets totalling 79 buses. All Darwinbus services are now exclusively operated by Mercedes-Benz O500LE buses with a mix of Volgren "CR228L" and Custom Coaches "CB80" bodywork.

CDC Northern Territory has announced plans to introduce nine Volvo Hybrid Buses to the fleet during the present six-year contract, although a timeframe for their introduction has not yet been made public.

Routes 
A total of 39 public bus routes are operated by Darwinbus, with the majority operating 7-days per week, excepting Christmas Day and Good Friday. A variety of services are provided, including all-stops and semi-express routes between the three interchanges at Darwin, Casuarina and Palmerston, in addition to feeder or shopper style services which predominantly run in a uni-directional circuit. During Mindil Beach Market Season (last Thursday in April to last Thursday in October), additional bus services run, and some late-night outbound bus services are extended to commence from Mindil Beach to facilitate access to the markets. For other significant events in Darwin, such as New Year's Eve, Darwin Show Day or Bass in the Grass, additional special event buses run.

Timetables and maps are available separately online from the NT Government Website. Service announcements are publicised on the CDC Northern Territory and NT DIPL Facebook pages, in addition to separate pages on the NT Government Website: Public Bus Alerts & Route Changes, and, Proposed Bus Changes.

All bus services inbound to Darwin Interchange utilise Mitchell Street, whereas outbound services travel via Cavenagh Street.

References

External links

www.transport.nt.gov.au/public/bus/darwin
CDC Northern Territory

Bus companies of the Northern Territory
Transport in Darwin, Northern Territory
Transport companies established in 1978
1978 establishments in Australia